Ivanka Petrova-Stoycheva (February 3, 1951 in Pernik – February 18, 2007) is a retired track and field shot putter from Bulgaria, best known for competing at the 1980 Summer Olympics in Moscow, USSR. There she ended up in 11th place, with a distance of 18.34 metres.

References
sports-reference

1951 births
2007 deaths
Bulgarian female shot putters
Athletes (track and field) at the 1980 Summer Olympics
Olympic athletes of Bulgaria
People from Pernik